SS Boris was the first Bulgarian merchant ship.

The ship was built by Wigham Richardson, Wallsend, in the United Kingdom, and launched on 21 May 1894. Boris arrived in Bulgaria on 2 July 1894 at 9.30 am in the Bay of Varna. In the first years the ship carried out voyages between the Bulgarian ports. On 21 September 1915 the ships Cyril, Boris, Bulgaria, Varna, and Tsar Ferdinand were moved to Lake Varna and anchored against the Cotton Factory. In 1920, the ship was struck by the Russian steamer Kronstadt near Sevastopol, during the evacuation of the remnants of the Bulgarian military in the Crimea. The Russian side found Sakharov, the captain of Kronstadt, guilty. As a result, Russia offered to replace the Boris with the Yalta.

References 

State archive of Varna Fund 616
в."Морски вестник"
Navibulgar, БЪЛГАРСКОТО МОРСКО ТЪРГОВСКО КОРАБОПЛАВАНЕ – фарватер през три столетия, издание на Параходство Български морски флот АД

Merchant ships of Bulgaria
Steamships of Bulgaria
Ships built on the River Tyne
1894 ships
Maritime incidents in 1920
Shipwrecks in the Black Sea
Ships sunk in collisions